This article contains a list of people who have served as mayor of Šibenik, the largest city in Šibenik-Knin County, and the tenth largest city in Croatia, since the establishment of the Republic of Croatia.

See also  
List of mayors in Croatia

References

External links 
Official website  

Šibenik
History of Croatia